The following is a list of ice hockey players who have been selected over the years to receive the Minnesota Minute Men Mr. Hockey award as the most outstanding senior high school hockey player in the state of Minnesota. The recipients are reviewed and selected by a group of National Hockey League scouts, Division I & III coaches and USHL scouts.

Mr. Hockey award winners

External links
 http://www.minnesotaminutemen.com/page/show/413477-mr-hockey

References

American ice hockey trophies and awards
Minnesota State High School League